Old Masonic Temple may refer to:

 Old Masonic Temple (Marshall, Minnesota)
 Old Masonic Temple (Trenton, New Jersey)